Bosnia and Herzegovina competed at the 1999 World Championships in Athletics from 20 – 29 August 1999.

Results

Men
Field events

Women
Track and road events

See also
 Bosnia and Herzegovina at the World Championships in Athletics

References

 IAAF

External links
Official local organising committee website
Official IAAF competition website

Nations at the 1999 World Championships in Athletics
World Championships in Athletics
1999